The 2018 UNAF U-17 Tournament was the 16th edition of the UNAF U-17 Tournament. The tournament took place in Marrakesh, Morocco, from 20 to 27 December, 2018.

Participants

 (invited)
 (hosts)

 (invited)
 (withdrew)

Venues
Annexe du Grand Stade de Marrakech, Marrakesh
Stade de Marrakech, Marrakesh

Match officials

Referees
 Hicham Temsamani (Morocco)  
 Amine Sekhraoui (Algeria) 
 Zidane Agrane (Libya) 
 Amir Loussif  (Tunisia) 
 Mahmoud Nagy Mosa (Egypt) 

Assistant Referees
 Abd Essamad Abertoun  (Morocco)
 Badr Farhan (Morocco)
 Haithem Bouima (Algeria)
 Mohamed Amine Araf (Algeria)
 Magdi Kamel (Libya)
 Mounji Abou Chkioua (Libya)
 Jamel Dorai (Tunisia)
 Ahmed Dhouioui (Tunisia)
 Mohammed Mahmoud Lotfy (Egypt)
 Mahmoud Said (Egypt)

Group stage
All times are local UTC+1.

Group A

Group B

Knockout stage

Fifth-Place

Third-Place

Final

Champions

References

2018 in African football
2018
2018 Morocco
2018–19 in Algerian football
2018–19 in Moroccan football
2018–19 in Tunisian football
2018–19 in Libyan football
August 2018 sports events in Africa